Mbinda is a town in the Republic of Congo, lying on the border with Gabon.  It is a transport hub and lies at the end of a railway line to Brazzaville.

Overview
The town prospered as the southern end of the 75 km COMILOG Cableway from Moanda in Gabon, exporting manganese via Brazzaville, but this closed in 1986 when the Trans-Gabon Railway was completed.  However, a rail link from Franceville to Brazzaville, probably via the town, is regularly proposed.

See also 

 Railway stations in Congo

References 

Populated places in the Republic of the Congo
Republic of the Congo–Gabon border crossings